The D Division is the division of the Royal Canadian Mounted Police responsible for federal policing in Manitoba and, at times, northwestern Ontario. Headquartered in Winnipeg, the division is commanded by Assistant Commissioner Jane MacLatchy and consists of 1089 police officers and 438 support staff.

As one of the 15 divisions of the RCMP, the D Division's federal policing duties include combating organized crime, border integrity, and VIP protection, among others.

D Division is also contracted by the Province of Manitoba to act as the provincial police. In that role, the division provides front-line policing to towns and rural areas which have not established their own police services. In addition, some municipalities which are responsible under Manitoba law for their own policing have chosen to contract the RCMP to provide that service. As a result, the division provides front-line policing services to over 500,000 people spread over nearly all of Manitoba's 650,000 square kilometres, including some of Canada's most remote areas.

History
The D Division was created around 1874 by the North-West Mounted Police (NWMP)—predecessor of the Royal Canadian Mounted Police (RCMP)—when its 275 officers and men were divided into six troops (i.e., divisions), identified by letters 'A' through 'F'.

Initially located in Fort Dufferin, Manitoba, D Division was stationed at the following locations between 1876 and 1919: Fort Macleod, Alberta (1876-1877), Shoal Lake (1878-1879), Battleford, Saskatchewan (1880-1886), Fort Macleod (1886), Fort Steele, British Columbia (1887-1889), and Fort Macleod (1889-1919). In 1919, D Division was assigned to Winnipeg, Manitoba, where it remains today.

In 1932, the RCMP moved into a building on Winnipeg's Portage Avenue that was constructed in 1927 as a home for the Salvation Army's William Booth Territorial Training College. The building was eventually replaced by the structure that stands today as the D Division headquarters. This new facility was opened between 31 May and 1 June 1979, and cost around $12 million.

Detachments
The RCMP in Manitoba provides policing services via 80 detachments, about 1000 regular members, and about 450 civilian and public service employees.

The division's federal units are almost all based out of the division's headquarters building in Winnipeg, but with an Integrated Border Enforcement Team based out of Altona.

Provincial policing
The Province of Manitoba contracts the RCMP D Division to act as the provincial police. In that role, the division provides front-line policing to towns and rural areas which have not established their own police services. In addition, some municipalities that are responsible under Manitoba law for their own policing have chosen to contract the RCMP to provide that service. As a result, the division provides front-line policing services to over 500,000 people spread over nearly all of Manitoba's , including some of Canada's most remote areas.

The province is divided into three geographical districts; north, west, and east, and each is commanded by a Superintendent. The districts are then divided into a total of 80 detachments. Some detachments are amalgamated, pooling resources together to serve a wider area more efficiently. The offices of an amalgamated detachments are referred to as a host and satellite offices.

The division's provincial policing resources are mainly spread around the province, with some specialty and support units based out of the headquarters building. Few detachments within the division have the resources to have police officers on-duty 24 hours a day, but instead rely on on-call officers to respond during quieter hours. Telephone calls to the RCMP within Manitoba are often routed to the Operational Communication Centre, located within the headquarters building. The OCC is staffed 24 hours a day, 7 days a week, 365 days a year with telecommunications operators, specialized civilians who are trained to take calls from the public and dispatch police officers.

In addition to detachments, the RCMP maintains community offices in smaller communities which provides office space for RCMP members to use on a temporary basis, and patrol cabins which provide overnight accommodations to RCMP members travelling to remote communities where there is no permanent policing presence.
 
The following communities have a detachment or satellite office of a larger detachment area. (Winnipeg is home to the Manitoba Headquarters on Portage Avenue, as well as the Winnipeg Airport detachment.)
 
Areas without all-weather road access, instead accessible only by ice road, air, boat, or rail are denoted by a *, while district headquarters are in bold.

North District
 
Chemawawin (office in Easterville)
Churchill*
Cranberry Portage
Cross Lake
Flin Flon
Gillam
Gods Lake Narrows*
Grand Rapids
Island Lake* (office in Stevenson Island)
Leaf Rapids
Lynn Lake
Moose Lake
Nelson House
Norway House
Oxford House*
Pukatawagan*
Shamattawa*
Snow Lake
The Pas
Thompson
Wabowden

West District
 
Amaranth
Boissevain
Brandon (office in RM of Cornwallis)
Carberry
Carman (also serves Altona)
Dauphin (also serves Ethelbert and Grandview)
Deloraine
Elphinstone
Hamiota
Killarney
Manitou (also serves Crystal City)
Melita
Minnedosa
Morden
Neepawa
Portage La Prairie
Reston
Roblin
Russell (also serves Rossburn * Russell)
Shoal Lake
Souris
Ste. Rose du Lac (also serves McCreary)
Swan River
Treherne
Virden
Wasagaming
Winnipegosis

East District
 
Arborg
Ashern
Beausejour
Berens River*
Bloodvein
Emerson
Falcon Beach
Fisher Branch
Gimli
Grand Marais (office in RM of St. Clements)
Gypsumville
Headingley
Lac du Bonnet
Little Grand Rapids*
Lundar
Morris
Oakbank
Peguis (office in Fisher Branch)
Pinawa
Poplar River*
Powerview
Red River North (formerly East St. Paul)
Selkirk
Sprague
St. Pierre-Jolys
Steinbach
Stonewall
Teulon
Whitemouth
Winnipeg Airport

Former detachments 

 Altona — this area is now served by the detachment in Carman (west district)
 Crystal City — this area is now served by the detachment in Manitou (west district)
 Ethelbert — this area is now served by the detachment in Dauphin (west district)
 Gladstone — this area is now served by the detachment in Neepawa (west district)
 Grandview — this area is now served by the detachment in Dauphin (west district)
 McCreary — this area is now served by the detachment in Ste. Rose du Lac (west district)
 Opaskwayak Cree Nation — policing transferred to the Manitoba First Nations Police Service in 2021
 Rossburn — this area is now served by the detachment in Russell (west district)

Support Units

The division houses units composed of police officers trained in specialized policing skills to provide support to the rest of the division or other police services within Manitoba under the division's duties as the provincial police. Some of these units include:
 
Emergency Response Team — providing advanced training and equipment to deal with situations such as armed and barricaded persons or high-risk search warrants
Explosives Disposal Unit — providing disposal of found explosives and improvised explosive devices, along with chemical, biological, or radiological dissemination devices, and post-blast investigations
Forensic Identification Services — collecting forensic evidence at crime scenes
Search and Rescue — locating lost people in remote areas; Search and Rescue Manitoba (SARMAN) is a shared responsibility between D Division, Manitoba's Office of the Fire Commissioner, and the Emergency Measures Organization.
Technological Crime — collecting evidence from technological devices
Tactical Troop — providing crowd control
Underwater Recovery Team — police diving unit for locating bodies or evidence underwater

Transportation

Policing such a large and often remote area requires presents transportation challenges. While the division employs the use of traditional police cars, the division also has many pick-ups, some equipped to run on train tracks, boats, snowmobiles, quads, and three Pilatus PC-12 aircraft, two stationed in Winnipeg and one in Thompson.

References

 D
Royal Canadian Mounted Police headquarters
Organizations based in Manitoba
Crime and justice in Manitoba